Vehkalahden neidot (Finnish: The Maidens of Vehkalahti) is a 1971 historical novel by Finnish author Kaari Utrio.

The story is fiction that takes place in the mid-1400s and is set up in the context of squires of Vehkalahti, somewhat anachronistically since these local lords were in 1400s yet similar noblemen like others of the tax-exempt rälssi class of Sweden. Only later, between c. 1690 and 1784, their descendants, heirs, were the anomalously-situated knaappi i.e squire group.

See also

References

External links
 

Novels by Kaari Utrio
1971 novels
Tammi (company) books
20th-century Finnish novels
Finnish historical novels
Novels set in the 15th century